Peterkin is a surname, alternatively spelled Peterken. It is a medieval diminutive of the given name Peter. Notable people with the surname include:

 Alexander Peterkin (1781–1846), Scottish writer
 Daisy Ann Peterkin (1884–1952), a dancer professionally known as Mademoiselle Dazie
 Elizabeth Helen Peterken, the birth name of Betsy McCaughey, an American politician
 Freddie Lee Peterkin, an American singer-songwriter
 George William Peterkin (1841–1916), the first Episcopal bishop of West Virginia
 Jamie Peterkin, b. 1982, a Saint Lucian Olympic swimmer
 Julia Peterkin (1880–1961), a South Carolina fiction writer
 Dr. Michael Peterkin, the founder of the Pierro winery in Australia
 Major-General Peter Grant Peterkin, b. 1947, a retired British army officer
 Rebekah Dulaney Peterkin (1847–1891), an American philanthropist
 Wilbur J. Peterkin (1904–1996), an American military officer.
 Thomas Alexander Peterkin, the Mayor of Lower Hutt (1907 - 1909)

Fictional characters

 Peterkin Gay, a character in the novel The Coral Island, 1858
 The Peterkins, an impractical family in The Peterkin Papers, 1880
 Peterkin, a cartoon satyr in Scrambled Eggs, a 1939 film
 Eric Peterkin, the half-Chinese amateur detective in the novel A Gentleman's Murder by Christopher Huang, 2018

References